Best node search (BNS), originally known as fuzzified game tree search, is a minimax search algorithm, developed in 2011. The idea is that the knowledge that one subtree is relatively better than some (or all) other(s) may be propagated sooner than the absolute value of minimax for that subtree. Then a repetitive search narrows until a particular node is shown to be relatively best.

First an initial guess at the minimax value must be made, possibly based on statistical information obtained elsewhere. Then BNS calls search that tells whether the minimax of the subtree is smaller or bigger than the guess. It changes the guessed value until alpha and beta are close enough or only one subtree allows a minimax value greater than the current guess. These results are analogous, respectively, to "prove best" and "disprove rest" heuristic search strategies.

The search result is the node (move) whose subtree contains the minimax value, and a bound on that value, but not the minimax value itself. Experiments with random trees show it to be the most efficient minimax algorithm.

Pseudocode

 function nextGuess(α, β, subtreeCount) is
     return α + (β − α) × (subtreeCount − 1) / subtreeCount
 
 
 function bns(node, α, β) is
     subtreeCount := number of children of node
 
     do
         test := nextGuess(α, β, subtreeCount)
         betterCount := 0
         for each child of node do
             bestVal := −alphabeta(child, −test, −(test − 1))
             if bestVal ≥ test then
                 betterCount := betterCount + 1
                 bestNode := child
         (update number of sub-trees that exceeds separation test value)
         (update alpha-beta range)
     while not (β − α < 2 or betterCount = 1)
 
     return bestNode

The default nextGuess function above may be replaced with one which uses statistical information for improved performance.

Generalization
Tree searching with Murphy Sampling is an extension of Best Node Search to non-deterministic setting.

External links
fuzzy minimax algorithms

References

Search algorithms